Mary, formerly named Merv, Meru and Alexandria Margiana, is a city on an oasis in the Karakum Desert in Turkmenistan, located on the Murgab River. It is the capital city of Mary Region. In 2010, Mary had a population of 126,000, up from 92,000 in the 1989 census. The ruins of the ancient city of Merv are located near the present-day city.

Etymology
Atanyyazow notes that the name "Muru" appears in Zoroastrian texts alongside the toponyms Sogd (Sogdia) and Bakhti (Bactria), and that the name "Margiana" appears carved into rocks at Behistun, Iran, dating back 2,500 years.  Atanyyazow adds, "the name was used in the form Merv-ash-Shahizhan", with subsequent forms including Muru, Mouru, Margiana, Marg, Margush, Maru, Maru-shahu-jahan, Maru-Shahu-ezan, Merv, and Mary, and that some scholars interpret the word marg as "green field" or "grassland", noting that in Persian marg can mean a source of livestock.

History
The ancient city of Merv was an oasis city on the Silk Road.  It was destroyed and its population annihilated in the 13th century by the Mongols. Because of its location on the Silk Road, it revived over time only to be largely destroyed again in the 19th century by nomadic Teke raiders.  Edmund O'Donovan described Merv in 1882 as
 ...only a "geographical expression." It means a certain amount of cultivated territory where half a million Tekke-Turkomans manage to eke out an existence by pastoral pursuits, plunder, and thievery, combined with the caravan service between Bokhara and Meshed.  There is no central point which you can call Merv now, if I except the place which has grown into existence since my arrival.  I speak of Koushid Khan Kala, a fort at a point on the river Murghab...

It was occupied by Imperial Russia in 1884, triggering the Panjdeh incident between Afghanistan, British forces, and the Imperial Russian Army. The modern settlement was founded later that year as a Russian military and administrative post.

A force of the British Indian Army consisting of a machine gun detachment comprising 40 Punjabi troops and a British officer resisted the Bolsheviks near Merv in August 1918, in what was the first direct confrontation between British and Russian troops since the Crimean War.

The area surrounding Mary was developed by the Soviet Union as a center for cotton production through the use of extensive irrigation. The Great Soviet Encyclopedia article on Mary reads in part,Mary (until 1937 Merv), city, center of Mary oblast' of Turkmen SSR. Located on the Murghab River and Karakum Canal. Junction of railroad lines to Tashkent, Krasnovodsk, and Kushka. 67 thousand residents (1973; 8.5 thousand in 1897, 37 thousand in 1939, 48 thousand in 1959). Large wool degreasing plant, cotton gin, machine building factories; building construction amalgamate; food (milling, baking, and meat packing amalgamates, dairy plant, etc.), leather industry, carpet production. Near to Mary began to operate in 1973 the Mary District State Electrical Power Plant. Medical and pedagogical colleges. Museum of history of the revolution.  Drama theater.

In 1968, huge reserves of natural gas were discovered 20 kilometers west of the city in the Shatlyk Gas Field.

Mary became the center of Mary Province on 18 May 1992, after the collapse of the Soviet Union and the Turkmen proclamation of independence.

In the 2000s, many streets and new residential areas were built. The new airport terminal was constructed, as was a new building for the Turkmen State Power Engineering Institute, a theater, the new library, a new historical museum, the Palace of Spirituality, the Margush Hotel, a medical diagnostic center, the Ene Mähri obstetric-pediatric medical center, the Gurbanguly Hajji Mosque, a stadium, an equestrian complex, an indoor swimming pool, and a new railway station.

In 2012, the city was declared one of the cultural capitals of the CIS.

Economy
Mary is Turkmenistan's fourth-largest city and a large industrial center for the natural gas and cotton industries, two of the nation's major export earners. It is a trade center for cotton, cereals, hides, and wool.

Culture

Library
Mary's library is the largest regional library in the Mary District. Construction of the library began in February 2010. The library officially opened on October 20, 2011 and the President of Turkmenistan, Gurbanguly Berdimuhamedov, held the official opening ceremony.

The building has a spherical shape, and is supported by 62 columns. The height of the library is 42 meters. The three-story building is designed for the storage of three million books, and can manage 600 concurrent readers. The library's collection includes a book shop, nine reading rooms, internet facilities, a separate reading room for elders, an office of special departments, conference rooms, and a children's room. Under the dome of the library, which is in the form of tulip petals, is a telescope.

Other

Mary is known for its regional museum.

The main football team is Merw Mary, who play at the Mary Stadium.

Notable people
Akmammedov Myratgeldy, Turkmen politician
Khadyr Saparlyev, Turkmen politician
Yelena Bonner, Soviet/Russian human rights activist
Eduard Asadov, Soviet/Russian poet and writer
Meredov Sytdyh, economist and writer

Gallery

International relations

Twin towns – Sister cities
Mary is twinned with:
 Jeddah, Saudi Arabia
 Samarkand, Uzbekistan
 Oryol, Russia
 Xi'an, China

References 

Murghab basin
Populated places in Mary Region
Transcaspian Oblast